The Ramones were an American rock band.

Ramones may also refer to:
Adal Ramones (born 1961), Mexican television show host and comedian
Ramones (album), the Ramones first album
Ramones (Screeching Weasel album)
Ramones (Operation Ivy EP), an EP by the ska punk band Operation Ivy

See also
"R.A.M.O.N.E.S.", a song by Motörhead
Ramone (disambiguation)